OWC can refer to:

 Office Web Components, a type of programmable control in Microsoft Office
 Open-wheel car, a car with its wheels outside of its main body
 Oscillating water column, a wave power technology
 Oil-water contact, the interface between layers of oil and water in hydrocarbon reservoirs
 "OWC", a song by Kent from the album Isola 
 Other World Computing, a computer hardware company specializing in Apple components
 Optical wireless communications
 Overwatch Contenders, a professional esports league